Saadet Işıl Aksoy (born 29 August 1983) is a Turkish actress, who received critical acclaim with her portrayal of Aska, a red-haired punk trumpet player in Italian actor-director Sergio Castellitto's film Twice Born, in which she co-starred with Penélope Cruz and Emile Hirsch. Christy Lemire described her as "the striking Saadet Aksoy" in her Twice Born review, and film critic David Rooney stated, "Saadet Aksoy brings a subdued fieriness to her scenes as a Bosnian woman" in The Hollywood Reporter. In his article on Variety, Boyd Van Hoeij wrote, "Turkish thesp Saadet Aksoy impresses in a supporting role as a spunky Yugoslav local" about her performance in Twice Born.

Sergio Castellitto explained his first encounter with Aksoy in an article on Vogue Turkey with these words: "Saadet, the first time I met you it was through the internet. I had accidentally 'fallen' on a movie trailer. I actually don’t remember anything of that trailer, of that movie. Yet I remember that I saw a woman turning her head abruptly to the camera, her blue eyes burning everything in that framing, blasting the reverse shot."

Her recent performance as Remziye in the 2018 movie Saf was described on Filmuforia as "SAF is carried forward by the sheer brilliance of Saadet Isil Aksoy whose Remziye acts in an enlightened and humanitarian way when the chips are down." In his article about Saf on The Film Stage, Jared Mobarak wrote: "Aksoy carries the rest of the film through an authentic progression from indignation to shame and ultimately to clarity.

Saadet Aksoy has been in the juries of such film festivals as Cairo International Film Festival, Sarajevo Film Festival and Istanbul Film Festival. She became the spokesperson for L'Oreal Paris in Turkey in the year 2013.

Early life
Aksoy was born in Istanbul to İnci Aksoy, a retired chief police inspector, and Anıl Aksoy, a retired police chief. She talks about the strong female figures in her family in an interview saying: "My mom and grandma have been my two role models. Both have stood out in life not only with their physical beauty but they have also been successful in their careers and been respected in life thanks to their identities and personalities." Her grandmother Münire Şahinbaş was one of the first female business magnates in Turkey.

Aksoy has two older brothers. In an interview she described her childhood and what cinema meant for her even at a young age: "There were always certain rules in the family. Even though my brothers and I were having so much fun together, I was also quite introverted. Movies were what took me away to completely different lands, and cinema has always amazed me since my childhood."

She takes her first name Saadet from her grandmother on her father's side who died before she was born, and like most Turkish names, it has a specific meaning. The word saadet means bliss in English.

Education and career
Saadet Aksoy studied English Language and Literature at Boğaziçi University in Istanbul. She took part in such TV projects in Turkey as Güz Yangını, Esir Kalpler, Senden Başka, Kalpsiz Adam, Sınıf, Balkan Düğünü and Muhteşem Yüzyıl. Her theatre appearances include the Turkish version of Steel Magnolias staged by the theatre director Mehmet Ergen and the Turkish version of Shoot/Get Treasure/Repeat originally written by British playwright Mark Ravenhill.

She made her film debut with Semih Kaplanoğlu's Egg, which premiered at Directors' Fortnight at Cannes Film Festival in 2007 bringing her several awards at many film festivals such as Valdivia International Film Festival and Sarajevo Film Festival. In 2008, she took part in the following film by Semih Kaplanoğlu, Milk, which was at Venice Film Festival Official Selection. She later worked with Argentinian director Alejandro Chomski in A Beautiful Life, and in 2009, she was in Bulgarian director Kamen Kalev's Eastern Plays, which premiered also at Directors' Fortnight at Cannes Film Festival. Film critic Jay Weissberg praised her performance in Eastern Plays in his article on Variety saying, "All performances are strong, but it’s Christov and Aksoy who linger in the memory."

Her 2009 Turkish film Love in Another Language brought her other Best Actress awards at Ankara International Film Festival and Bursa Silk Road Film Festival. Again in 2009, she took part in the Istanbul scene of The Rebound with Catherine Zeta Jones and Justin Bartha by the director Bart Freundlich. Her international breakthrough was after she co-starred with Penélope Cruz and Emile Hirsch in Sergio Castellitto's Twice Born adapted from the novel with the same title by Margaret Mazzantini. The movie premiered at Toronto International Film Festival in 2012. In 2013, Aksoy played a Greek girl Eleni in the Turkish movie Sürgün and in 2015, Rania in Ragion di Stato directed by Marco Pontecorvo for Italian TV network RAI.

Aksoy's latest projects include Saf by Ali Vatansever, which premiered at Toronto International Film Festival in 2018, Passed by Censor by Serhat Karaaslan, which is expected to be released in 2019, and Iguana Tokyo by Kaan Müjdeci, recently in post-production.

Filmography

Film

Television

Awards

References

External links
 
 

Turkish film actresses
Living people
Boğaziçi University alumni
1983 births
Actresses from Istanbul